Robotron may refer to:

Arts and entertainment
 Robotron: 2084, an arcade video game (1982)
"Robotron", a ZX Spectrum video game (1985)
Robotron X, a PlayStation 1 video game (1996)
Robotron 64, a Nintendo 64 video game (1998)
 "Robotron 2000", a 2000 song by Freezepop from Freezepop Forever
 "Robotron 2002", a 2002 remix on Fashion Impression Function
 The monsters of the week on Power Rangers Beast Morphers

Companies
 VEB Robotron, an East German computer company, part of which is now Robotron Datenbank-Software GmbH
 Robotron Group, an Australian high technology company